Devadoothan is a 2000 Indian Malayalam-language 
musical mystery horror film, produced by Siyad Koker under the banner of Koker Films, directed by Sibi Malayil and written by Raghunath Paleri. The film stars Mohanlal in the title role with Jaya Prada, Vijayalakshmi, Janardhanan, Jagathy Sreekumar, Murali, Sarath Das and Vineeth Kumar in supporting roles. The cinematography was done by Santosh Thundiyil and it features original songs and score composed by Vidyasagar.

The plot follows Vishal Krishnamoorthy, who was expelled as a student from college for playing a prohibited musical instrument, Seven Bells, an offense he is innocent of. The incident derailed his bright and promising young career. Years later, he is invited by the college principal to direct a musical to be performed at the college. Vishal returns to unravel the mystery of the Seven Bells, which he claims to plays by itself.

Devadoothan was released during Christmas, on 22 December 2000. Despite being average at box office because the concept was not digested by the audience at that time but the film received positive critical reception. Over the years, the film has accumulated a cult following and huge fan base. It won three Kerala State Film Awards, including Best Film with Popular Appeal and Aesthetic Value, Best Music Director and Best Costume Designer.

Plot
Vishal Krishnamoorthy, a reputed musician is about to receive a prestigious musical award for his symphony Rhythm of Love. The story now cuts back to his past where Vishal is struggling to pay his debts and to build a career of his own. Despite having a deep knowledge in music, he experiments with other businesses which all ended in failure. One day, Vishal gets a letter from the principal-cum-priest of his old college from which he was expelled. It was an invitation to work as the director for a musical play with the present students of the college. At first, Vishal refuses to go because of his hatred towards the college, but he later changes his mind.

Years ago, Vishal was expelled from the college by Madam Angelina Ignatius who runs the institution in the memory of her late father, William Ignatius. There was a special musical instrument called the "Seven Bells" kept by Angelina, locked inside a chapel within the college where no one was allowed to enter. Vishal was accused by Angelina for playing the Seven Bells, but his refutation was the instrument was playing by itself. But Angelina had him expelled from the college.

Vishal arrives at the college. The play is about the romance of Mary and Nikhil Maheshwar. Mary is the only daughter of a rich man who falls in love with a young musician, Nikhil Maheshwar. Despite her father's dislike, she falls for Maheshwar. Later, Maheshwar goes to get the consent of his parents for their marriage, but never to return. Mary keeps waiting for him. While rehearsing the play, Vishal interferes at certain occasions and changes parts of the story.

On the night of his arrival, while composing a song for the play, Vishal hears a beautiful melodic composition from the tape record near him. He turns it off, but the music continues playing automatically. He realizes that it is the same melody that was heard from the Seven Bells instrument for which he was expelled. The next day, as the rehearsal progresses, in a scene where Mary expresses her love to Maheshwar, Vishal suggests that they replace the name Mary with Alina which he intuitively deduces from the music he heard last night.

At that night too, Vishal is woken by the same music. He follows it and finds that it is coming from the chapel of the Seven Bells. He rushes there to see who is playing it, but sees nobody but the instrument playing by itself. Hearing the music, Angelina also gets there and sees Vishal sitting in front of the Bells. She accuses him again for playing it and tries to get him out of the college, but Vishal decides to stay and to find out the truth.

Vishal asks the principal about the name Nikhil Maheshwar. He says that it was from an old romantic poem written by Angelina. Looking for answers, he visits an old priest who was the former principal of the college and who knew Angelina from a young age. He tells Vishal that her actual name is Alina. She got the Seven Bells instrument from her father William Ignatius as a gift. William also brought someone from Agra to play the instrument. His name was Maheshwar. Alina's admiration of Maheshwar's music turned to love, enraging her father. Then after six years, Maheshwar left the place promising that he would return, but he never came back and Alina is still waiting for him.

Vishal searches for books about the Seven Bells in the college library. He finds a piece of paper with some musical notations from an old book. He feels that it was written by Maheshwar. Trying to play it on the instrument, he recognizes it as the same music he hears at night, but he feels like he is losing his vision. By intuition, he concludes that Maheswar was blind. He goes to Angelina and shows the music to her. She admits that it was created by Maheshwar and she wrote it down. She now realizes that Vishal was innocent of the accusation for which he was expelled from college.

At night, when Vishal is sitting in front of the Seven Bells, Sneha, the student who plays the role of Alina in the play and who is a fan of Vishal's music comes to the chapel and requests him to play the bells. Vishal reveals the truth that it is not he who plays the instrument but some invisible person.

Vishal dreams about a horse carriage and when he tells it to Angelina, she brings Vishal to see the old carriage in which she used to take Maheshwar out. There he meets Alberto, William's old stableman. Vishal feels something mysterious about Alberto. Vishal goes to the library again to find more books about the Seven Bells, but he finds a human skeleton in a glass case. He is told by the principal that it was the workers who got it when they dug the soil for laying the foundation for a new hostel block. He finally concludes that the Seven Bells was played by Maheshwar's soul.

The search for whereabouts on Maheshwar leads Vishal to Alberto who reveals to him that Maheswar was buried alive by him under orders of William, Alina's father, who himself died soon after the burial in an accident. The skeleton in the library is revealed to be Maheshwar's. When Vishal tells Sneha that he cannot let Alina know about the truth, the Seven Bells starts playing violently. Seeing this, Alina now understands the truth and she goes to the library hall where the skeleton is kept. Vishal tries to stop her but he is unable to do so. After a mysterious light comes out from the library, Vishal and Sneha enter the library and they find Alina dead and two doves are seen outside, flying away meaning that Alina is finally with Maheswar. The film ends by showing Vishal dedicating his award to Maheswar and Alina by placing it above The Seven Bells in the present.

Cast

 Mohanlal as Vishal Krishnamoorthy
 Jaya Prada as Angelina Ignatius  Aleena
 Janardhanan as Principal Edward 
 Jagathy Sreekumar as Priest Thankachan
 Murali as Alberto
 Jagadish as Ithakk
 Sharath Das as Manoj
 Joice Nadakapadom as Joy
 Vineeth Kumar as Maheshwar
 Vijayalakshmi as Sneha
 Lena as Annie Kurian
 Dhanya Menon as Azhagi
 Radhika as a college student
 Sandra Amy as a college student
 Kitty as William Ignatius, Aleena's father
 Vishnu Bhuvanendran as violinist
 Jijoy Rajagopal as Varghese Kuruvila
 Nirmala as Young Aleena

Soundtrack

The film's songs were composed by Vidyasagar and all lyrics were penned by Kaithapram Damodaran Namboothiri (except the Tyagaraja song "Entharo Mahanu"). The traditional Tyagaraja song "Entharo Mahanu" was re-mixed with a western classical composition for the film. Vidyasagar won the Kerala State Film Award for Best Music Director for the film. The soundtrack was released by the music label Satyam Audios.

Production
The film was developed by Sibi as his debut project in 1983 but could be made only 17 years later. Raghunath Paleri wrote the screenplay about two parallel love stories, one between two college students getting haunted by the tragic romance between a blind musician and a rich heiress. Naseeruddin Shah and Madhavi were Sibi's choices in 1985, the draft when 7 year old boy Vishal sent by his father for boarding school and become friends with Ghost (Shah)  trying to rope in R.Madhavan and finally casting Mohanlal in 1999

Release

Devadoothan was a Christmas release on 22 December 2000. The film received positive critical reception, it won four Kerala State Film Awards, including the award for Best Film with Popular Appeal and Aesthetic Value, Best Music Director for Vidyasagar for its critically acclaimed songs.

Reception
Though the film was an average grosser at the box office, it received critical acclaim and attained a cult status for its cinematography and making, along with the use of deep feeling dialogues, uniqueness of love and romance and extensive depth of background score, which redefines that music can be enjoyed irrespective of language barrier.

Mohanlal's 'Vishal Krishnamoorthy' remains one of the most memorable and underrated characters of his career.

Accolades

See also 
 List of Malayalam horror films
 Manichitrathazhu
 Aayushkalam

References

External links

2000 films
2000s Malayalam-language films
2000 horror films
2000s horror thriller films
2000s mystery thriller films
2000s romantic musical films
Indian romantic horror films
Indian romantic musical films
Films directed by Sibi Malayil
Films scored by Vidyasagar
Indian horror thriller films
Indian mystery thriller films